Lars Melvang (born April 3, 1969) is a Danish former football (soccer) defender. He played mostly for Odense BK and Silkeborg, but also had a disappointing spell with Watford in 1997. He has two younger brothers, Jens and Jakob Melvang.

References and external links
Blind, Stupid and Desperate - Watford FC site - Gone but not forgotten
Lars Mandrup Melvang(Lars Melvang) - playerhistory.com 

1969 births
Living people
Soccer players from Seattle
Danish men's footballers
Silkeborg IF players
Watford F.C. players
Odense Boldklub players
Association football defenders